Mahmoud Abdelfattah is a Palestinian-American basketball coach who is currently an assistant coach for the Houston Rockets of the National Basketball Association (NBA). He is the first ever Palestinian and first ever Muslim to be named head coach of an NBA or NBA G-League franchise.

Coaching career 
Abdelfattah began his coaching stint with Perspectives Charter Schools in 2011, serving as the assistant head coach for the team.

In 2019, after spending his first season as assistant coach for the Rio Grande Valley Vipers and winning his first championship with the franchise, Abdelfattah was duly promoted to be the head coach of the team.

Abdelfattah was named the NBA G League Coach of the Year for the 2021–22 season after leading the Vipers to a 24–10 record. The Vipers eventually would win another title.

On July 3, 2022, the Houston Rockets hired Abdelfattah as an assistant coach.

Head coaching record
As of April 19, 2022

|-
| align="left" |Rio Grande Valley Vipers
| align="left" |2019–20
|42||15||27||.357 || align="center"| Season canceled
|-
| align="left" |Rio Grande Valley Vipers
| align="left" |2020–21
|15||9||6||.600 || align="center"| Lost in Quarterfinals
|-
| align="left" |Rio Grande Valley Vipers
| align="left" |2021–22
|35||25||10||.714 || align="center"| Champions
|-class="sortbottom"
| align="center" colspan=2|Career||92|||49|||43||.533||

References

External links
Mahmoud Abdulfettah coaching profile at Rio Grande Valley Vipers

Living people
American men's basketball coaches
American people of Palestinian descent
Basketball coaches from Illinois
Houston Rockets assistant coaches
Rio Grande Valley Vipers coaches
Year of birth missing (living people)
American Muslims